Raghubir Sahai was an Indian politician.  He was elected to the Lok Sabha, the lower house of the Parliament of India from  Badaun, Uttar Pradesh as a member of the Indian National Congress.

References

External links
Official biographical sketch in Lok Sabha website

1896 births
Lok Sabha members from Uttar Pradesh
India MPs 1952–1957
India MPs 1957–1962
Indian National Congress politicians
Year of death missing
Indian National Congress politicians from Uttar Pradesh